Angaria javanica is a species of sea snail, a marine gastropod mollusk in the family Angariidae.

Description

The shell can grow to be 35 mm in length.

Distribution
Angaria javanica can be found off of Java, Indonesia.

References

External links
 To World Register of Marine Species

Angariidae
Gastropods described in 1999